The Neighbourhood Management Pathfinder Programme was a co-operative programme in England between residents and stakeholders such as the local authority, businesses etc., aimed at improving specific deprived neighbourhoods.

The programme was sponsored, and part funded, by the Neighbourhood Renewal Unit of the Department for Communities and Local Government who are responsible for overseeing the UK Government's neighbourhood renewal strategy in England.

The programme was started in July 2001 when twenty schemes were announced. Fifteen further programmes started in December 2002. All schemes received revenue grants over a seven-year period to pump prime the renewal initiatives. After seven years, the schemes continued to operate within existing funding provisions.

See also
 Housing Market Renewal Initiative
 Neighbourhood Renewal Fund

References
 Neighbourhood Management Pathfinder Programme: Guidance on Building Partnerships, Developing a Strategy and Producing a Delivery Plan 2001, Neighbourhood Renewal Unit.
 Research Report 31 - Joining up for Safer Neighbourhoods: A Theme Report from the Neighbourhood Management Pathfinder Programme National Evaluation, August 2006, Department for Communities and Local Government.
 Neighbourhood Management Pathfinders: Final Evaluation Report, October 2008, Department for Communities and Local Government.

Public bodies and task forces of the United Kingdom government
Neighbourhood Management
Public policy in England
2001 establishments in England
2001 in British politics